RFA Wave Chief was a Wave-class fleet support tanker of the Royal Fleet Auxiliary that was built in 1946 as SS Empire Edgehil by Harland & Wolff, Govan, Glasgow, United Kingdom.

She saw service during the Korean War, earning a battle star. Wave Chief also served in the First Cod War and Second Cod War against Iceland. She was extensively modified in the early 1960s and escorted Sir Alec Rose around Cape Horn, South America in April 1968. She was decommissioned and laid up at Rosyth, Fife, in August 1974, and arrived at Inverkeithing, Fife, for scrapping on 13 November 1974.

Description
The ship was built by  Harland & Wolff, Govan, Glasgow. She was yard number 1306.

The ship was propelled by two steam turbines, double reduction geared, driving a single screw propeller . The turbines were made by Metrovick, Manchester, Lancashire.

History
Empire Edgehill was launched on 4 April 1946. On 27 July 1946, she was transferred to the Admiralty and three days later she was completed as Wave Chief, allocated the United Kingdom Official Number 180935 and the pennant number X119.

Wave Chief was initially chartered out before she was taken over by the Royal Fleet Auxiliary. She was operating in the Mediterranean in 1947, when one of her firemen was discharged dead at Suez, Egypt. In 1949, she loaded a cargo at Abadan, Iran and delivered it to Sydney, Australia. On 25 June 1950, Wave Chief joined the United States Seventh Fleet for naval operations.

On 27 July 1953, Wave Chief was awarded a battle honour for her service during the Korean War. During December 1956 and January 1957, Wave Chief accompanied  during the Duke of Edinburgh's tour of the southern oceans. From 1957, she took part in Operation Grapple X, the British hydrogen bomb tests at Christmas Island. On 13 November 1957, she ran aground at Batu Puteh, Singapore, holing all but four of her eighteen tanks.

From November 1958, Wave Chief was deployed supporting Royal Navy ships in operations off Iceland in the First Cod War. These deployments continued until February 1961. In 1961, Wave Chief came to the assistance of the Haisboro Light Vessel which was sinking off the Norfolk coast after being in collision with another ship. The squadron, under the command of Vice-Admiral Sir Fitzroy Talbot, visited ports in Argentina, Brazil, Chile, Dominican Republic, Ecuador, Peru and Venezuela.

On 12 December 1967, Wave Chief was severely damaged in a storm in the Mediterranean. Repairs were carried out at Gibraltar. On 25 April 1968, Wave Chief departed from Punta Arenas, Chile to rendezvous with the yacht Lively Lady, which was being sailed single-handedly around the world by Alec Rose. She escorted Lively Lady around Cape Horn, South America on 1 April. From 15–17 March 1973, Wave Chief assisted Icelandic Coast Guard, Royal Air Force and Royal Navy units in the unsuccessful search for survivors from the trawler Sjoestjaman.

From May to August 1973, Wave Chief operated in support of Royal Navy units involved in the Second Cod War. She was decommissioned in August 1974 and laid up at Rosyth, Dunbartonshire. In September she was listed for disposal. Wave Chief was purchased for £208,825 to Thos. W. Ward. She arrived at Inverkeithing, Fife on 13 November 1974 for scrapping, which took place in 1975.

References

1946 ships
Ships built in Govan
Empire ships
Wave-class oilers
Tankers of the Royal Fleet Auxiliary
Maritime incidents in 1961
Ships built by Harland and Wolff